He Zhenyu (born 28 June 2001), also known as Dongda He, is a Chinese professional footballer who plays as a forward for Wolverhampton Wanderers.

Club career

Wolverhampton Wanderers
On 10 August 2018, Wolverhampton Wanderers signed Dongda He for an undisclosed fee from Notts County.

On 16 April 2020, He would sign a new contract with Wolves till the summer 2023.

In February 2021, He was loaned to Chinese Super League side Beijing Guoan. He's first appearance for the club was the first game of the season in a 2–1 away loss against Shanghai Shenhua where he came off the bench for Cédric Bakambu in the 77th minute.

Career statistics

References

External links
 

2001 births
Living people
Footballers from Shenyang
Chinese footballers
Association football forwards
Notts County F.C. players
Wolverhampton Wanderers F.C. players
Beijing Guoan F.C. players
Chinese Super League players
Chinese expatriate footballers
Expatriate footballers in England
Chinese expatriate sportspeople in England